Hans Sachs (5 November 1494 – 19 January 1576) was a German Meistersinger ("mastersinger"), poet, playwright, and shoemaker.

Biography
Hans Sachs was born in Nuremberg. As a child he attended a singing school that was held in the church of Nuremberg. This helped to awaken in him a taste for poetry and music. His father was a tailor. He attended Latin school in Nuremberg
. When he was 14 he took up an apprenticeship as a shoemaker.

After the apprenticeship, at age 17, he was a journeyman and set out on his Journeyman years (Wanderjahre or Walz), that is, travelling about with companions and students. Over several years he worked at his craft in many towns, including Regensburg, Passau, Salzburg, Munich, Osnabrück, Lübeck, and Leipzig.

In 1513 he reached the small town of Wels, where he remained for a time, devoting himself to the cultivation of the fine arts. The Emperor Maximilian I chanced to pass through this town with his dazzling retinue, and the young poet allowed himself to be carried away by the splendour of the court. The prince placed him in the halls of the palace of Innsbruck. Later Hans Sachs quit the court and went to Schatz and Munich.

In the same year, he took up a kind of apprenticeship to become a mastersinger at Munich. Lienhard Nunnenbeck, a linen weaver, was his master. In 1516 he settled in Nuremberg and stayed there for the rest of his life. On 1 September 1519 he married Kunigunde Creutzer (1502–1560). He had seven children, but all died while he was still alive.  He married again on 2 September 1561, this time to the young widow Barbara Harscher.

The great event of his intellectual life was the coming of the Reformation; he became an ardent adherent of Luther, and in 1523 wrote in Luther's honor the poem beginning “The nightingale of Wittenberg, which is heard everywhere”, and four remarkable dialogues in prose, in which his warm sympathy with the reformer was tempered by counsels of moderation. In spite of this, his advocacy of the new faith earned him a reproof from the town council of Nuremberg, and he was forbidden to publish any more “pamphlets or rhymes”. It was not long, however, before the council itself openly threw in its lot with the Reformation.

Works

He wrote over 6000 pieces of various kinds. Exact numbers vary widely in secondary literature, mainly because it is not always clear if a piece is an independent work or part of a larger work. Also, certain works may be put in different categories by different authors. His productivity is especially remarkable because he kept working as a shoemaker throughout his life. (As far as is known, the Mastersingers did not as a common practice write or sing for money.) His works include

Mastersongs proper (about 4200)
other poems and songs
Carnival plays
Tragedies
Comedies
Prose dialogues
Fables
 Religious tracts, including “A wonderful prophecy of the papacy about how things will go for it up until the end of the world” in collaboration with Andreas Osiander (1527).

Assessment
His mastersongs were not published, being intended solely for the use of the Nuremberg Meistersinger school, of which Sachs was the leading spirit. His fame rests mainly on the “spoken poems” which include his dramatic writings. His “tragedies” and “comedies” are, however, little more than stories told in dialogue, and are divided by convenient pauses into a varying number of acts. Sachs had little idea of the essentials of dramatic construction or the nature of dramatic action.

The subjects are drawn from the most varied sources, but particularly the Bible, the classics and the Italian novelists. He succeeds best in the short anecdotal Fastnachtsspiel or Shrovetide play, where characterisation and humorous situation are of more importance than dramatic form or construction.

Some of his farces have been played on the modern stage. Among these are:
 Der fahrende Schüler im Paradies (1550)
 Das Wildbad (1550)
 Das heiss Eisen (1551)
 Der Bauer im Fegefeuer (1552)

As a fictional character
Hans Sachs is the subject of an opera (1840) by Albert Lortzing. He is a leading character in Richard Wagner's opera Die Meistersinger von Nürnberg (1868).

References

External links

Spiegel.de (some Works in German)
fh-augsburg.de (other works in German)
ni.schule.de (more works in German)
R. Wagners Die Meistersinger von Nürnberg

 
 

1494 births
1576 deaths
Musicians from Nuremberg
German Lutherans
Converts to Lutheranism from Roman Catholicism
16th-century German poets
16th-century German male writers
Shoemakers
German male poets
German male dramatists and playwrights
16th-century German dramatists and playwrights
German male composers
16th-century German composers
16th-century German musicians
16th-century male writers